Gleniffer Lake also known as Gleniffer Reservoir or originally Lake Gleniffer
 is an artificial lake in central Alberta, Canada created in 1983  by the construction of the Dickson Dam which impounded the Red Deer River, a major tributary of the South Saskatchewan River which flows into the Saskatchewan River Basin.

Gleniffer Lake has day-use areas, cottages, a campground and resort developments including Carefree Resort and Gleniffer Lake Resort.

The lake reservoir is a source of drinking water for the surrounding area.

Dickson Dam
Dickson Dam regulates the flow of the Red Deer River to control for floods and low winter flows, to improve quality of the river, to create a recreational resource and to provide a reliable, year-round water supply sufficient for future industrial, regional and municipal growth.

Gleniffer Reservoir Provincial Recreation Area
Gleniffer Reservoir Provincial Recreation Area (PRA) is a recreational area with a beach, various fishing areas, boating, camping and resorts. In the summer of 2009, Alberta Tourism, Parks and Recreation consolidated six provincial recreation areas at Dickson Dam and around Gleniffer Lake  (Dickson Dam–Cottonwood PRA, Dickson Dam–Dickson Point PRA, Dickson Dam–North Dyke PRA, Dickson Dam–South Dyke PRA, Dickson Dam–North Valley PRA, Dickson Dam–South Valley PRA) into one provincial recreation area renamed Gleniffer Reservoir PRA. Motorboating, waterskiing, swimming, and sailboarding are allowed. There are rainbow trout in a trout pond. Pike, Walleye, Rockies, and Brown Trout are also found nearby.
Gleniffer Reservoir PRA has trout ponds including one at Dickson Point which is popular for ice fishing.

Environmental concerns

Pipeline leaks
Increased water flow of the Red Deer River system during heavy rainfall in June 2008 eroded supporting soil, freely exposing a section of Pembina Pipeline Corporation's  Cremona crude oil pipeline to the Red Deer River currents. The remediation was completed in 2011.

Rangeland pipeline incident

References

Lakes of Alberta
Reservoirs in Alberta
Red Deer County